The 2015 Lyon Sevens was the second tournament of the 2015 Rugby Europe Sevens Grand Prix Series. It was held over the weekend of 13–14 June 2015.

Teams
The 12 participating teams for the tournament:

Pool Stage

Pool A

Pool B

Pool C

Knockout stage

Bowl

Plate

Cup

External links

France Sevens
2014–15 in French rugby union
Grand Prix 2